Udon Thani Football Club (Thai: สโมสรฟุตบอลจังหวัดอุดรธานี) is a Thai professional association football club based in Udon Thani province. Founded in 1999, the club currently competes in the Thai League 2.

History

Early years
The team was founded in 1999 by the first chairman, Sathaporn Kotabut, and joined the Thailand Provincial League or Pro League in 1999. They competed in this league until 2004. Their best season was a 4th-place finish in their inaugural campaign. The club did not participate in the League from 2005 to 2008.

In 2009 the club made a comeback and joined AIS Regional League Division 2 North Eastern region, with new chairman, Mr.Pongsart Kitjanukorn, and they finished the season in 3rd place. The club was then registered as a corporation in order to make it professional. Udon Thani FC was playing in Division 2 North Eastern region.

In 2011 the club was playing in Division 2 North Eastern region. In November 2012 Samretwot Yothawijit come to take over the club and the main policy was "Udon Thani FC belongs to all Udon Thani's people" and main target was to take the club to Division 1. Udon Thani FC was playing in Division 2 North Eastern region, where they finished 3rd. Udon Thani FC finished 2nd in Division 2 North Eastern region and qualified for the promotion play-off. There they was drawn into group B, where they ended in 5th place.

In 2014 they is playing in Division 2 North Eastern region. The coach Phithaya Santawong got replaced in the mid-season break with Wutthiwat Dangsamerkiat returning. He was also the coach back in 2011. Udon Thani FC is playing in Division 2 North Eastern region. Udon Thani FC is playing in Division 2 North Eastern region.

In 2017 the club was pass to play in professional league first time in 2018 Thai League 2 that they try to promoted to this league for a long time by finished third place in 2017 Thai League 3.

Kits

Stadium and locations

Honours

Domestic competitions
 Regional League North-East Division
 Winners (1) : 2016
 Runners-up (2) : 2013, 2014

Season by season record

Udon Thani did not participate in the League from 2005 to 2008.

P = Played
W = Games won
D = Games drawn
L = Games lost
F = Goals for
A = Goals against
Pts = Points
Pos = Final position

QR1 = First Qualifying Round
QR2 = Second Qualifying Round
R1 = Round 1
R2 = Round 2
R3 = Round 3
R4 = Round 4

R5 = Round 5
R6 = Round 6
QF = Quarter-finals
SF = Semi-finals
RU = Runners-up
W = Winners

Players

Current squad

Former players

Halls of Fame

100 Appearances Players 
100 Appearances Players (2009–present)
  Satja Saengsuwan
  Thanathip Paengwong
  Ratchanon Phangkaew
  Amnach Worawiboon
  Tredsak Samart
  Chaimongkol Botnok
* Senior club appearances counted for all league, FA-cup, league cup and play-off games.

Club officials

Head Coach history

References

External links
 Official Facebookpage of Udon Thani FC
 Udon Thani FC in English
สโมสรฟุตบอลจังหวัดอุดรธานี
โปรวินเชียลลีก
Online magazin für Thai fussball
Thai League Football
Thai League Online
Udon Thani FC Clubwebsite

 
Association football clubs established in 1999
Football clubs in Thailand
Udon Thani province
1999 establishments in Thailand